PSIA or psia may refer to:

 Physical Security Interoperability Alliance, industrial standardization initiative promoting interoperability of IP-enabled security devices
 Pounds per square inch absolute (including atmospheric pressure)
 Professional Ski Instructors of America, an organization offering training and certification for U.S. Ski Instructors
 Philippine Software Industry Association
 Paris School of International Affairs
 Private Schools Interscholastic Association
 Palm Springs International Airport
 Public Security Intelligence Agency, the national intelligence agency of Japan